Frances Mary McPhun (1880 – 1940) was a Scottish suffragette who served two months in Holloway prison, and had organised events and processions for women's suffrage in Edinburgh.

Life

Frances Mary McPhun was born in Glasgow in 1880. She studied at the University of Glasgow, graduating with an MA degree, and winning prizes in Political Economy, Moral Philosophy and English Literature. She and her sister Margaret McPhun joined the Women's Social and Political Union (WSPU). She arranged a pageant of famous Scottish women for a women's suffrage procession in Edinburgh in October 1909. She was honorary organising secretary for the Scottish Suffrage Exhibition in 1910, and was honorary secretary of the Glasgow branch of the WSPU in 1911-1912. She and her sister were amongst dozens jailed for smashing government office windows in March, 1912. She served two months hard labour in Holloway. The sisters used the name "Campbell" to hide their background when they were arrested. When they were released from Holloway Prison after two months they were given Hunger Strike Medals  'for Valour' by the WSPU to record their hunger strikes, although the sisters had agreed that they would choose to drink from a cup to avoid being force fed through a nasal tube. She was very active in by-election campaigns in the west of Scotland. Frances McPhun died in 1940 in Glasgow. The younger sister of Frances and Margaret McPhun was Nessie McPhun, who married a Glasgow businessman called Andrew R Findlay. A grandson of Andrew and Nessie Findlay is Scottish Conservative MSP Russell Findlay, who made reference to the sisters in a speech to the Scottish Parliament in March 2022 [8]

References
8. https://www.parliament.scot/chamber-and-committees/official-report/what-was-said-in-parliament/meeting-of-parliament-03-03-2022?meeting=13611&iob=123571#orscontributions_M16201E327P816C2384109 The Scottish Parliament

Scottish suffragettes
Politicians from Glasgow
20th-century Scottish women politicians
20th-century Scottish politicians
Alumni of the University of Glasgow
1880 births
1940 deaths
Women's Social and Political Union
Hunger Strike Medal recipients